In Spain and in the rest of the Hispanic world, a peineta is a large decorative comb usually worn under a mantilla, or lace head covering.

The hair ornament, worn by women, consists of a convex body and a set of teeth that affix it to hair worn in a bun. The peineta was once made of tortoise shell, but is now usually made of synthetic materials such as acrylic or plastic.

The origin of the peineta goes back to the 19th century in Spain, but there is evidence of its use on the Iberian Peninsula as early as the 5th century BCE and in other areas from the 17th century. It is used today primarily during special occasions such as weddings, bullfights, Holy Week processions, and traditional performances of flamenco music.

The peineta is usually worn with a mantilla, a veil worn over the head and shoulders. The mantilla is also a common element of some Valencian and Andalusian costumes.

In some countries, such as Chile, it is known as peinetas a los peines, while in the Philippines it is referred to as payneta, often much smaller than its Iberian ancestor and may be bejewelled or made of gold.

Etymology
From Spanish 'peinar' and Latin 'pectinare' "to comb".

References

Latin American clothing
Spanish clothing
Headgear
Philippine clothing